Alessandro "Sandro" Lopopolo (18 December 1939 – 26 April 2014) was an Italian 1959 amateur featherweight and 1960 amateur lightweight boxing champion, and also world boxing champion in the light welterweight division afterwards, when he turned professional, between 1961 and 1973. Sandra Lopopolo started his career in 1957, losing his first against amateur boxer Nino Benvenuti, in the 12th round, in Madison Square Garden, New York City.

Boxing career
Sandro Lopopolo was considered as a hometown favorite for the lightweight division Olympic boxing title at the 1960 Summer Olympics in Rome where he won the silver medal. 
At the Olympics, after four easy wins in the early rounds, Lopopolo defeated the Argentine Abel Laudino by split decision in the semifinals. He lost the final to Kazimierz Paździor by a majority decision. Lopopolo turned professional in early 1961 and had a long and successful professional career. Fighting in the light-welterweight category most of his professional career, Lopopolo won the Italian light-welterweight titles in 1963 and 1965 and held the European and World light-welterweight title from April 1966 to April 1967.

Lopopolo won the Lineal, WBA and WBC light welterweight titles from Carlos Morocho Hernández on 29 April 1966, after outpointing his opponent. He lost the crown to Paul Takeshi Fuji on 30 April 1967 by technical knockout in the 2nd round. He retired with a record of 58 wins (20 KOs), 10 losses and 7 draws. Lopopolo liked to box from a distance and was part of “the golden era” of Italian boxing, with the likes of Duilio Loi, Nino Benvenuti, Sandro Mazzinghi, Bruno Arcari and Carmelo Bossi.

Lopopolo died in 2014, at age 74, in his hometown, Milan, due to a complication from a respiratory infection.

Professional boxing record

See also
List of world light-welterweight boxing champions

References

External links

Sandro Lopopolo - CBZ Profile

 

|-

|-

1939 births
2014 deaths
Italian male boxers
Boxers from Milan
Boxers at the 1960 Summer Olympics
Medalists at the 1960 Summer Olympics
Olympic silver medalists for Italy
Olympic boxers of Italy
Olympic medalists in boxing
World Boxing Association champions
World Boxing Council champions
The Ring (magazine) champions
Light-welterweight boxers
World light-welterweight boxing champions